Kuklov is a village and municipality in Senica District in the Trnava Region of western Slovakia.

History
In historical records the village was first mentioned in 1394.

Geography
The municipality lies at an altitude of 162 metres and covers an area of 18.704 km². It has a population of about 790 people.

People
Andrej Žarnov, poet

References

External links

 Official page

Villages and municipalities in Senica District